Blue Flame is a rocket-powered car.

Blue Flame may also refer to:

Film and theater
The Blue Flame (play), a 1920 play by George V. Hobart and John Willard
Blue Flame (film), a 1993 science fiction movie

Music
 Jimmy James and the Blue Flames, a 1960s American rock band formed by Jimi Hendrix
 Georgie Fame and the Blue Flames, a 1960s British R&B band
 Blue Flames, a 1964 album by Shirley Scott and Stanley Turrentine
 Blue Flame, a 2001 album by Simon Shaheen and Qantara
 Blue Flame (Jon Allen album), 2018
 "Blue Flame", a song by Joe Jackson from Volume 4
 "Blue Flame", a song by Alice Nine from 9
 "Blue Flame", a song by Le Sserafim from Fearless

Other
 Blue Flame (engine), a Chevrolet engine

See also
 Kardemir Karabükspor, a Turkish sports club nicknamed 'Blue Flame'